MV Discovery Sun was the flagship and sole ship of Discovery Cruise Lines, a Miami-based tour operator. She was built at the Orenstein & Koppel shipyard in Lübeck, Germany in 1968 and was renovated in 1995 and then updated in 2000. She was previously named Scandinavian Sun for day cruise operator SeaEscape.

MV Discovery Sun provided a regular service from Port Everglades in Fort Lauderdale to Grand Bahama Island and acted as a passenger cruise ferry service.

On 20 August 1984, while operating as the Scandinavian Sun, a fire broke as the ship was docking at the Port of Miami. The fire was started by lubricating oil leaking from a diesel generator, and spread through a ladder access way and open passageways to the passenger areas of the ship. One crew member and one passenger were killed, and 57 passengers and crew were injured.

Fate
In September 2011, Discovery Cruise Lines ceased operations, citing high operating costs and lack of profitability. Discovery Sun was subsequently offered for sale, but there was no buyer or charterer. Discovery Sun was broken up for scrap at Chittagong on 13 February 2012.

External links
 Discovery Cruise Line Website - archive.org copy
 Professional photographs from shipspotting.com

References

1968 ships
Casinos in Florida
Cruise ships of Germany